Kilcolman is a townland in the civil parish of Desertserges, County Cork, Ireland. It is approximately 5km from the village of Enniskean.

There is a primary school called Kilcolman National School located in the nearby townland of Maulbrack, also in Desertserges civil parish.

Notes

Townlands of County Cork